National Highway 966 (NH 966) is a highway which connects Palakkad, Malappuram and Kozhikode district headquarters in Kerala. It was previously known as NH 213. It covers a distance of 125 km. At Ramanattukara, near Kozhikode, it joins NH 66. At Palakkad it joins NH 544, which connects Coimbatore and Cochin through Palakkad.

Major cities and linking towns
 Kozhikode
Ramanattukara (junction with NH 66 bypass)
Kondotty / Karipur(Airport)
Valluvambram junction
Malappuram
Perinthalmanna
Mannarkkad
Mundur (junction connecting SH 53 (Mundur - Cherpulassery-Perinthalmanna))
Palakkad

See also
 National Highways Development Project
 List of National Highways in India (by Highway Number)
 List of National Highways in India

External links

966
National highways in India
Roads in Palakkad district
Roads in Malappuram district
Roads in Kozhikode district